The year 2011 is the 3rd year in the history of Tachi Palace Fights, a mixed martial arts promotion based in The United States. In 2011 Tachi Palace Fights held 4 events beginning with, TPF 8: All or Nothing.

Title fights

Events list

TPF 8: All or Nothing

TPF 8: All or Nothing was an event held on February 18, 2011 at the Tachi Palace in Lemoore, California.

Results

TPF 9: The Contenders

TPF 9: The Contenders was an event held on May 6, 2011 at the Tachi Palace in Lemoore, California.

Results

TPF 10: Let The Chips Fall

TPF 10: Let The Chips Fall was an event held on August 5, 2011 at the Tachi Palace in Lemoore, California.

Results

TPF 11: Redemption

TPF 11: Redemption was an event held on December 2, 2011 at the Tachi Palace in Lemoore, California.

Results

References

Tachi Palace Fights events
2011 in mixed martial arts